The following is a list of presidents of Mozambique, since the establishment of the office of President in 1975.

The current president is Filipe Nyusi. Nyusi was inaugurated for his first term as the fourth president of Mozambique on 15 January 2015, and for his second, final term on 15 January 2020.

Presidents of Mozambique (1975–present)

|- style="text-align:center;"
! colspan=8| People's Republic of Mozambique

|- style="text-align:center;"
! colspan=8| Republic of Mozambique

Timeline

Latest election

See also

Mozambique
List of prime ministers of Mozambique
List of colonial governors of Mozambique
List of heads of the National Resistance Government of Mozambique
Lists of office-holders
List of current heads of state and government

Sources
 http://rulers.org/rulm2.html#mozambique
 http://www.worldstatesmen.org/Mozambique.htm
 African States and Rulers, John Stewart, McFarland
 Guinness Book of Kings, Rulers & Statesmen, Clive Carpenter, Guinness Superlatives Ltd
 Heads of State and Government, 2nd Edition, John V da Graca, MacMillan Press 2000

References

Mozambique, List of Presidents of
 
1975 establishments in Mozambique
Presidents
Presidents